Saros cycle series 146 for lunar eclipses occurs at the moon's ascending node, repeating approximately every 18 years 11 and 1/3 days. It contains 72 events.

This lunar saros is linked to Solar Saros 153.

See also 
 List of lunar eclipses
 List of Saros series for lunar eclipses

Notes

External links 
 www.hermit.org: Saros 146

Lunar saros series